Flavia Fortunato (born  16 March 1964) is an Italian singer, actress and television presenter.

Life and career 
Born in Cosenza, Fortunato studied dance and artistic gymnastics for ten years, and  performed artistic gymnastics at a competitive level, becoming a regional champion. She made her debut as a singer in 1982, with the single "Delirio". In 1983 she was entered into the Sanremo Music Festival with the song  "Casco blu", reaching the finals; the single peaked at number 11 on the Italian hit parade in 1983. The same year she debuted as television presenter, hosting the RAI musical show Discoteca festival.

During the 1980s, Fortunato was a constant presence on television, as hostess as well as musical guest in popular variety shows. She also entered the Sanremo Music Festival five more times between 1984 and 1992. In 1989 she made her acting debut on stage, starring alongside Lando Buzzanca in L'opera da tre soldi. In the 1990s, she focused on theater and television, then she gradually moved away from show business to devote herself to her family.

Discography 

 Album    
     1984 - Flavia (Five Record, FM 13529)
     1986 - Verso il 2000 (Pipol, PLP 00444)
     1990 - Piccole danze (Fonit Cetra, LPX 253)
     1991 - Le donne chi sono (Fonit Cetra, LPX 262)

 Singles 
     1982 - "Delirio/Sola" (Yep, 5390-749)
     1982 - "L'amore è/Non piangerò" (Yep, 5390-758)
     1983 - "Casco blu/Promessa d'amore" (Yep, 5390-760)
     1983 - "Rincontrarsi/Se tu vuoi" (Yep, 5390-762)
     1984 - "Aspettami ogni sera/Stella di chi" (Yep, ZBYE-7353)
     1985 - "C'è una ragione/Come stai" (Five Record, FM-13087)
     1986 - "Verso il 2000/E mi manchi un po' di più" (Pipol, PNP-00663)
     1986 - "Nuovo amore mio/Un angelo" (Pipol, PNP-00665)
     1987 - "Canto per te/Attimo blu" (Yep, YNP 00993)
     1988 - "Una bella canzone/Anna non lo sa" (Fonit Cetra, SP 1863)
     1992 - "Per niente al mondo (parte 1)/(parte 2)" (Columbia, 657843) (with Franco Fasano)

References

External links 

 
 Flavia Fortunato at Discogs

People from Cosenza
1964 births
Italian pop singers
Italian composers
Italian women singers
Living people
Italian stage actresses
Italian television presenters
Italian women television presenters